Magaly Beatriz Bonilla Solis (born 8 February 1992) is an Ecuadorian race walker. She competed in the women's 20 kilometres walk event at the 2016 Summer Olympics.

References

External links
 

1992 births
Living people
Ecuadorian female racewalkers
Place of birth missing (living people)
Athletes (track and field) at the 2016 Summer Olympics
Olympic athletes of Ecuador
Athletes (track and field) at the 2019 Pan American Games
Pan American Games competitors for Ecuador
21st-century Ecuadorian women